The 2016 New York State Senate elections were held on November 8, 2016, to elect representatives from all 63 State Senate districts in the U.S. state of New York.

The Republicans maintained control of the State Senate because of Simcha Felder and members of the Independent Democratic Conference caucusing with the Republican majority. The Democrats gained a seat by filling a vacancy.

Republican candidates won 31 seats while Democrats won 32 seats. The closest races were John Brooks' victory in the 8th district and Carl Marcellino's victory in the 6th district, with both races being decided by less than two percentage points.

This election was the first in which John Flanagan served as Majority Leader. Andrea Stewart-Cousins retained her role as Minority leader.

Notes

References 

Senate
New York State Senate
New York State Senate elections